Aspilapteryx spectabilis is a moth of the family Gracillariidae. It is known from Tyrol in western Austria, where it can be found at altitudes between 2,200 and 2,500 meters.

The larvae probably feed on  plantago aristata. They probably mine the leaves of their host plant.

References

Aspilapteryx
Moths of Europe
Moths described in 1994